Journal of Public Policy & Marketing is a quarterly peer-reviewed academic journal published by the American Marketing Association. It covers all aspects of the intersection of marketing and public policy. It was originally established in 1979 as Public Policy Issues in Marketing, and renamed itself to Journal of Marketing & Public Policy 1982 for one year, before settling on the current name in 1983.

Abstracting and indexing
The journal is indexed and abstracted in the following bibliographic databases:

According to the Journal Citation Reports, the journal has a 2018 impact factor of 2.457.

Awards
Since 1993, the journal annual awards the Thomas C. Kinnear award to recognize the article that makes "the most significant contribution to the understanding of marketing and public policy issues". The article must have been published in the journal within the most recent three-year period.

Notable papers

References

External links 
 

Marketing research

Marketing journals
English-language journals
Quarterly journals